The O'a Caldera, also known as Shala, is a volcanic caldera in Ethiopia. It has two lakes: Lake Shala and a small maar called Lake Chitu. Sub-features include Mount Fike (a pyroclastic cone) and Mount Billa (a cinder cone).

References

Volcanoes of Ethiopia
Calderas of Ethiopia
Rift volcanoes
VEI-7 volcanoes